Olmedo Canton is a canton of Ecuador, located in the Manabí Province.  Its capital is the town of Olmedo.  Its population at the 2010 census was 9,844.

Demographics
Ethnic groups as of the Ecuadorian census of 2010:
Montubio  57.8%
Mestizo  34.6%
White  4.1%
Afro-Ecuadorian  3.4%
Indigenous  0.1%
Other  0.1%

References

Cantons of Manabí Province